Ivano-Frankivsk Oblast is subdivided into districts (raions) which are further subdivided into territorial communities (hromadas).

Current

On 18 July 2020, the number of districts was reduced to six. These are:
 Ivano-Frankivsk (Івано-Франківський район), the center is in the city of Ivano-Frankivsk;
 Kalush (Калуський район), the center is in the city of Kalush; 
 Kolomyia (Коломийський район), the center is in the city of Kolomyia;
 Kosiv (Косівський район), the center is in the city of Kosiv;
 Nadvirna (Надвірнянський район), the center is in the city of Nadvirna;
 Verkhovyna (Верховинський район), the center is in the urban-type settlement of Verkhovyna.

Administrative divisions until 2020

Before July 2020, Ivano-Frankivsk Oblast was subdivided into 20 regions: 14 districts (raions) and 6 city municipalities (mis'krada or misto), officially known as territories governed by city councils.
Cities under the oblast's jurisdiction:
Ivano-Frankivsk Municipality
Cities and towns under the city's jurisdiction:
Ivano-Frankivsk (Івано-Франківськ), the administrative center of the oblast
Bolekhiv Municipality
Cities and towns under the city's jurisdiction:
Bolekhiv (Болехів)
Burshtyn Municipality
Cities and towns under the city's jurisdiction:
Burshtyn (Бурштин)
Kalush (Калуш)
Kolomyia (Коломия)
Yaremche Municipality
Cities and towns under the city's jurisdiction:
Yaremche (Яремче)
Urban-type settlements under the city's jurisdiction:
Vorokhta (Ворохта)
Districts (raions):
Bohorodchany (Богородчанський район)
Urban-type settlements under the district's jurisdiction:
Bohorodchany (Богородчани)
Solotvyn (Солотвин)
Dolyna (Долинський район)
Cities and towns under the city's jurisdiction:
Dolyna (Долина)
Urban-type settlements under the district's jurisdiction:
Vyhoda (Вигода)
Halych (Галицький район)
Cities and towns under the city's jurisdiction:
Halych (Галич)
Urban-type settlements under the district's jurisdiction:
Bilshivtsi (Більшівці)
Horodenka (Городенківський район)
Cities and towns under the city's jurisdiction:
Horodenka (Городенка)
Urban-type settlements under the district's jurisdiction:
Chernelytsia (Чернелиця)
Kalush (Калуський район)
Urban-type settlements under the district's jurisdiction:
Voinyliv (Войнилів)
Kolomyia (Коломийський район)
Urban-type settlements under the district's jurisdiction:
Hvizdets (Гвіздець)
Otyniia (Отинія)
Pechenizhyn (Печеніжин)
Kosiv (Косівський район)
Cities and towns under the city's jurisdiction:
Kosiv (Косів)
Urban-type settlements under the district's jurisdiction:
Kuty (Кути)
Yabluniv (Яблунів)
Nadvirna (Надвірнянський район)
Cities and towns under the city's jurisdiction:
Nadvirna (Надвірна)
Urban-type settlements under the district's jurisdiction:
Bytkiv (Битків)
Deliatyn (Делятин)
Lanchyn (Ланчин)
Rohatyn (Рогатинський район)
Cities and towns under the city's jurisdiction:
Rohatyn (Рогатин)
Urban-type settlements under the district's jurisdiction:
Bukachivtsi (Букачівці)
Rozhniativ (Рожнятівський район)
Urban-type settlements under the district's jurisdiction:
Broshniv-Osada (Брошнів-Осада)
Perehinske (Перегінське)
Rozhniativ (Рожнятів)
Sniatyn (Снятинський район)
Cities and towns under the city's jurisdiction:
Sniatyn (Снятин)
Urban-type settlements under the district's jurisdiction:
Zabolotiv (Заболотів)
Tlumach (Тлумацький район)
Cities and towns under the city's jurisdiction:
Tlumach (Тлумач)
Urban-type settlements under the district's jurisdiction:
Obertyn (Обертин)
Tysmenytsia (Тисменицький район)
Cities and towns under the city's jurisdiction:
Tysmenytsia (Тисмениця)
Urban-type settlements under the district's jurisdiction:
Lysets (Лисець)
Yezupil (Єзупіль)
Verkhovyna (Верховинський район)
Urban-type settlements under the district's jurisdiction:
Verkhovyna (Верховина)

References

Ivano-Frankivsk
Ivano-Frankivsk Oblast